The Philippine Basketball Association draft is an annual event dating back to 1985 in which the twelve teams from the Philippine Basketball Association (PBA) can draft players who are eligible and wish to join the league. The draft usually takes place between October to December, during the league's off-season. No player may sign with the PBA until he has been eligible for at least one draft. However, foreign player-nationals of Filipino descent are ineligible for both the draft and the league if they are aged 31 years and up.

Eligibility
All players have to be natural-born Filipinos. Persons who chose Philippine citizenship by the age of maturity are considered as natural-born citizens.

For local players the requirements are that they must:
 Be 22 years old on the day of the draft, previously 21. If the players are 19 or older but not yet 22, they must have completed at least two years of college eligibility. Formerly, applicants younger than 21 must have either been college graduates or played four years of their eligibility;
 Be also 22 or above and four years removed from their high school graduation or have had only one year of college basketball;
 Play at least seven games in one PBA Developmental League conference;
 Reach at least  in height.

Filipino-descended foreigners have almost the same requirements as locals except they must:
 Play at least seven games in each of the two PBA Developmental League conferences, unless they are at the age of 27 and above but, since July 2021, under 30;
 Have a valid Philippine passport. Until the 46th season's draft in March 2021, they must have had documents from the Department of Justice and the Bureau of Immigration proving their Philippine citizenship. This clause was repealed later in November that year;
 Ensure that, if they graduated from secondary school outside the Philippines, but did not enroll in a Philippine or non-Philippine college or university, four years have passed since their secondary school class graduated;
 Have signed a contract with a professional basketball team outside the PBA, anywhere in the world, and have played under that contract. They also must be released from their contract before they can leave to go to the PBA.

Any person who played for the Philippines men's national basketball team is exempted from the D-League and is automatically eligible for selection. The changes in eligibility rules are in effect starting in the 2015 draft. For the 46th season's draft held on March 14, 2021, the PBA decided to forgo the seven-game requirement after the 2020 PBA D-League Aspirants' Cup was cancelled.

Imports – non-Filipino citizens, even those born in the Philippines – do not enter the PBA via the draft. They are directly signed by teams, and only play in some conferences. Naturalized citizens can only play in the association also as imports. But, an undrafted player with Filipino descent who is a foreign national age 31 and above is ineligible to be an import.

Starting with the 47th season's draft in 2022, the following changes were implemented:

Players who opt out of the draft on their year of eligibility had to sit out five years before they can apply again:
Players can still enter the draft three years into the five-year sit-out period but they are not be part of the regular draft. Instead they are entered in a special lottery which includes all franchises.
Filipino-descended foreigners must have a valid passport and not be older than age 30.

Order
The natural drafting order is determined by the teams' final rankings within each conference from the previous season, with rankings from the PBA Philippine Cup having heavier weight; the team with the worst record picks first, and the team with best winning percentage picking last in the first and second rounds.

The drafting order is also subject to change if a team deals their draft picks in trades. The draft is finished if all teams have passed.

Draft lottery
Before 2015, a draft lottery determined which team gets the first overall draft pick, but in a much smaller scale; only the two worst-performing teams in the preceding season participated. The team with the worst record had a 67% chance of clinching the No. 1 seed while the second-worst only got a 33% chance. The lottery was usually held prior to the finals of the final conference of the season. It was abandoned after the controversies that aroused during the lottery for the first pick of the 2014 draft.

Number of rounds
From 1985 to 2004 and since 2011, the PBA has had unlimited number of rounds until all the teams have passed, with all undrafted players becoming free agents.

From 2005 to 2010, the association limited the draft to two rounds. This restriction was attributed to an agreement between the PBA and the Philippine Basketball League (PBL), which also included a development fee to the PBL team from which the player was drafted. This was removed in 2011 as the PBL had folded, and amateur players played in the PBA D-League instead.

Expansion draft
There have been three expansion drafts in the league's history. The first was in 1990, in which the new teams Pepsi Hotshots and the Pop Cola Sizzlers selected up to six players from the expansion pool, which is made up of three players from each of the six existing franchises. The second was in 2000, when newcomers Batang Red Bull Energizers selected players from the draft.

An expansion draft for new teams Blackwater Elite and Kia Sorento was held on July 18, 2014, so that both team can form its rosters for the 2014–15 season. The 10 existing PBA franchises protected up to 12 players in their roster. Two time MVP Danny Ildefonso of the Meralco Bolts was selected as the first pick of the expansion draft by Blackwater, followed by Reil Cervantes of Barako Bull by Kia.

Carry over amateurs
If a new franchise also has an existing franchise from an amateur league (from the Philippine Basketball League before 2011 and the PBA D-League afterwards), the franchise, upon approval from the PBA's Board of Governors, may be given an incentive of selecting players from their amateur team to be directly elevated to their PBA team. This was last given to the Welcoat Dragons, who elevated three players from their PBL team.

List of first overall picks

Flags indicate the country were the player competed as college student-athletes; all players are Filipinos until proven otherwise, like Sonny Alvarado's case where he fled the country as his citizenship was being questioned.

Notes

By school

References

 
Recurring sporting events established in 1985
1985 establishments in the Philippines
Annual sporting events in the Philippines